The International Antarctic Centre is a research centre and public science discovery centre in the suburb of Harewood, Christchurch, New Zealand, near Christchurch International Airport.

Description

The Centre is home to the New Zealand, US and Italian Antarctic Programmes, and comprises administration offices, warehousing, an American/New Zealand clothing store, a post office and travel agency, the Antarctic Passenger Terminal and the Visitor Centre, now called 'The Antarctic Attraction'.

The Antarctic Attraction consists of Antarctic exhibits, a café, and bar. The centre operates a Hagglund Ride around the centre's land. This is aimed mainly at children, and displays the mobility of the Hagglund Antarctic vehicle. There is an Antarctic snow storm room, an audiovisual display, and little blue penguins at the NZ Penguin Encounter. The centre is set up for taking in penguins from the wild that are in need of help.

Awards
On 24 September 2009, at the Canterbury Champion Awards Dinner, it was announced that the International Antarctic Centre had been judged the overall winner in the Champion Host – medium, large enterprise category. The International Antarctic Centre was recognised as the Champion Host Winner and shared the finalist category along with Whale Watch Kaikoura and Canterbury Museum.

Ownership
The International Antarctic Centre was bought by tourism company Real Journeys in October 2015 from Christchurch Airport. Along with Real Journeys, the International Antarctic Centre became part of the privately-owned Wayfare Group, subsequently re-branded as RealNZ.

References

External links 

 International Antarctic Centre website

New Zealand and the Antarctic
Buildings and structures in Christchurch
Tourist attractions in Christchurch
1990s architecture in New Zealand